William McCreery (May 17, 1786 – September 27, 1841) was a Jacksonian member of the U.S. House of Representatives from Pennsylvania.

William McCreery was born in Omagh, County Tyrone, Ireland.  He immigrated to the United States in 1791 with his parents, who settled near Fairfield, Pennsylvania.  He moved to Paris, Pennsylvania, in 1812 and engaged in agricultural pursuits.  He was a member of the Pennsylvania House of Representatives from 1824 to 1827.  He was a constructor of the Pennsylvania State Canal and of the Pennsylvania State Highway from 1826 to 1831.

In 1828, McCreery defeated incumbent Joseph Lawrence, in a near-Democratic sweep of Pennsylvania's congressional delegation. McCreery was elected as a Jacksonian to the Twenty-first Congress. He was an unsuccessful candidate for reelection in 1830 to the Twenty-second Congress.

He served as collector of internal revenue at Pittsburgh, Pennsylvania, from 1831 to 1833, and was again a member of the Pennsylvania House of Representatives from 1833 to 1836. He served as superintendent of the Pennsylvania State Canal in 1835, residing in Allegheny City, Pennsylvania.  He was the acting president of the Pennsylvania Board of Canal Appraisers at the time of his death in Fairfield in 1841. His remains were interred in Up-the-Valley United Presbyterian Church Cemetery.

References

Sources

The Political Graveyard

Democratic Party members of the Pennsylvania House of Representatives
Irish emigrants to the United States (before 1923)
People from Omagh
Politicians from Pittsburgh
1786 births
1841 deaths
Jacksonian members of the United States House of Representatives from Pennsylvania
19th-century American politicians